Sparrows is a 2015 internationally co-produced film directed by the 2006 short film oscar nominee Rúnar Rúnarsson, starring Atli Óskar Fjalarsson, Rakel Björk Björnsdóttir and Ingvar Eggert Sigurðsson. It tells the story of a 16-year-old boy who moves from his mother in Reykjavík to his father in the Icelandic countryside. It was screened in the Contemporary World Cinema section of the 2015 Toronto International Film Festival. It was selected as the Icelandic entry for the Best Foreign Language Film at the 89th Academy Awards but it was not nominated. Sparrows became a festival darling and on top of its great festival run the film has been honored with 20 international film awards since it was awarded the Golden Shell at the 63rd San Sebastián International Film Festival.

Cast
 Atli Óskar Fjalarsson as Ari
 Ingvar Eggert Sigurðsson as Gunnar
 Kristbjörg Kjeld as Grandmother
 Rakel Björk Björnsdóttir as Lára
 Rade Šerbedžija as Tomislav
 Valgeir Hrafn Skagfjörð as Bassi

Production
The film was produced by Denmark's Nimbus Film and its subsidiary Nimbus Iceland, together with Pegasus Pictures and MP Film. It received three million Danish kroner in support from the Danish Film Institute as well as backing from the Icelandic Film Centre, The Croatian Audiovisual Centre and Nordisk Film & TV Fond. Filming began on 14 July 2014 in Iceland.

See also
 List of submissions to the 89th Academy Awards for Best Foreign Language Film
 List of Icelandic submissions for the Academy Award for Best Foreign Language Film

References

External links
 Official website
 
 Sparrows at the Icelandic Film Centre
 Vancouver International Film Festival (program note)
 TIFF (program note)

2015 films
Danish drama films
Films directed by Rúnar Rúnarsson
Films set in Iceland
Films shot in Iceland
Icelandic drama films
2010s Icelandic-language films
Febiofest award winners